The Brabham BT7 (also known as Repco Brabham BT7) is a Formula One racing car. It was raced by the Brabham Racing Organisation and several privateers from 1963 to 1966. A development of its predecessor, the Brabham BT3, the car proved to be competitive during 1963 and 1964, taking Dan Gurney to two victories. Technical issues prevented the BT7 from scoring better results. The car was equipped with a more reliable Hewland gearbox compared to the Colotti-Francis in the BT3. Malcolm Sayer from Jaguar Cars was consulted to give input for the revised chassis. The slick aerodynamics proved particularly strong at high speed circuits such as Monza or Spa. Its successor, the BT11, was a slightly altered BT7 aimed for customers such as Rob Walker or Jo Siffert.

It was in this car that Denny Hulme debuted in Grand Prix racing. He would later win the 1967 World Driver's Championship.

The BT7 was also raced in Formula 2 by Hubert Hahne among others using a 2-litre BMW Neue Klasse engine (pictured).

Complete Formula One World Championship results
(key) (results in bold indicate pole position, results in italics indicate fastest laps)

 Points were awarded on a 9–6–4–3–2–1 basis for the first six positions at each round with only the best six (1963-1965) or five (1966) round results retained. Only the best placed car from each manufacturer at each round was eligible to score points. Numbers in parentheses are total points scored; numbers not in parentheses are points counted towards the championship
 In 1963, the 28 points counting towards the championship were scored using the BT7; the two dropped points were scored using a BT3
 In 1964, 25 points were scored using the BT7; the remaining 5 points were scored using a BT11
 In 1965, all points were scored using a BT11

References

Brabham BT07